Malignant Tumour is a Czech band formed in 1991 in Ostrava.

History

1991–1997: Formative years 

Malignant Tumour was formed in Ostrava in the fall of 1991 by Martin "Bilos" Bílek and Roman Restel at the ages of 15 and 14, respectively.
During the first few years of the band, the members would constantly change instruments, and became labelled as noisecore.

When drummer Libor Šmakal entered the band in 1992, their style changed to be more influenced by the work of British grindcore band Carcass. In this line-up, they recorded their early demo tapes Cadaveric Incubator of Endo-Parasites (1993), Symphonies for Pathologist (1994) and Analyse of Pathological Conceptions (in 1995). In late 1995, Šmakal was replaced by Michal "Cichoň" Cichý, leading to Restel departing from the band, being replaced by Otto Beran and the band releasing a split EP with Decomposed titled Malignus Morbus with Decomposed, and then three the next year with Immured, Mastic Scum and In Growning called Forensic Clinicism – The Sanguine Article, Sick Sinus Syndrome and Swarming of Virulency.

In 1997, the band released a compilation split EP entitled Hungry Urinary Urn with Negligent Collateral Collapse, C.S.S.O. and Catasexual Urge Motivation and released their split LP Eat the Flesh... and Vomica with Squash Bowels. After the recording the album, Cichý and Beran left the band to focus on their other projects Cerebral Turbulency and Needful Things.

1997–2001: Equality!? 

In 1997, Marek "Švejk" Pavlík was hired to play drums, just as Bílek took over bass duties (leading to Richard Chrobok being hired as the band's guitarist). Lyrics changed from pathological topics to socially-aware ones, opposing homophobia, inequality, racism and world slavery. The band then recorded the demo tape Killing for Profit in 1997 and split EPs Rock Stars – Money Wars with Dead Infection, and Murder for You to Eat with Vomito in 1998. This was followed up by a split LP, Is This the Earth's Last Century?, with Alienation Mental and their first solo EP, Equality!?, also in 1998. At the end of the same year, drummer Marek "Švejk" Pavlík left the band and Michal "Cichoň" Cichý returned.

Cichý was soon replaced by Michal "Kameň" Kaminsky, before Chrobok also departed in mid-2000, being replaced by Marek Marunič. The band then recorded and released two split EPs, Man Made the End with Agathocles and Get to Attack with Unholy Grave. After disagreements began with Marunič, he left the band and Bílek took over guitar once more, picking up Petr "Dino" Šarina as their new bass player, who only lasted a few performances.

2001–2003: Relocation to the Netherlands and Dawn of the New Age 
Bílek relocated from the Czech Republic to the Netherlands, in which an entirely new line-up was formed, including brothers Johan and Jelle Smits on drums and bass, respectively. This line-up released the split EP Oegstgeest Grindcore with Intumescence in 2002, double split EP In Oil We Trust with Critical Madness, Szargyerek and Anubis, and the band's first full-length LP Dawn of the New Age in 2003. However, Bílek returned home to Ostrava in mid-2003.

2003–2007: Burninhell 

In mid-2003, Robert "Šimek" Šimek become the band's new bass player, having left his previous band Cerebral Turbulency, just as drummer Martin "Marsel" Ondejka joined. With this new line-up, the music was slowly evolved from raw crust punk to a dirtier rock and roll style with a crusty edge, evident on the band's next split EP Hammer and Anvil with Lycathrophy from 2004. In summer 2004, Martin "Marsel" Ondejka departed without notice and was replaced by drummer David Ševčík, who had worked with bands such as Dysentry and Večírek. The band then built upon this "crust 'n' roll" style on their second full-length album Burninhell, released in 2005. The album was rated as the third-best album of the year in the Břitva music awards. On this album, guitarist Martin "Korál" Vyorálek made a guest appearance, having played in both Erebus and GG Pump, officially joining later that year. Together, the band recorded their next split LP, entitled Rock'n'Roll Engine, in 2006 with Gurkha. The split received good reviews and wound up as the third-best mini album of the year, according to the Břitva music awards.

2007–2012: In Full Swing and Earthshaker 

In the summer of 2008, the band's next album In Full Swing was released, which lead the band to become compared to Motörhead by press and fans; however, the band disregards these statements, taking them as a compliment. The album was praised by reviewers and was nominated as album of the year in the Czech Anděl Music Awards in the category of Hard & Heavy, and wound up at the second spot. Two years later, the band recorded in the German recording studio Stage One for their next album Earthshaker. This marked the first time the band had worked with a professional producer (Andy Classen). The album received moderate to good reviews, leading to the band winning the album of the year in Anděl Award in Hard & Heavy category in 2010 and wound up second in Břitva.

2012–present: Overdose & Overdrive and The Metallist 

In December 2012, drummer David Ševčík left the band and his place was taken over by Petr "Bohdič" Bohda, who had previously worked with bands such as El Ray, GG Pump, Erebus, Citron, Pouze Znouze and Nagauč. In early 2013, Malignant Tumour entered Stage One Studio once again to record their next album, Overdose & Overdrive, again with Andy Classen as producer.

Achievements and awards 
Malignant Tumour has played over a thousand performances on three continents. In 2010, Earthshaker won the Anděl Award for Album of the Year in the category of Hard & Heavy. In 2008, the band won the Břitva Czech music polls for album of the year thanks to their third album, In Full Swing, and Břitva Czech music polls in 2008 as live band of the year. In 2010, the music video Earthshaker won music video of the year.

Members

Current line-up 
 Martin "Bilos" Bílek – vocals (1991–present), guitar (1991–1997; 2001–present), bass (1997–2001)
 Šimek – bass, backing vocals (2003–present)
 Korál – guitar, backing vocals (2006–present)
 Bohdič – drums (2013–present)

Past members 
Roman Restel – bass (1991–1995)
Libor Šmakal – drums (1993–1995)
Michal "Cichoň" Cichý – drums (1995–1997)
Otto "Oťas" Beran – bass (1995–1996)
Marek "Švejk" Pavlík – drums (1997–1999)
Richard Chrobok – lead guitar (1997–1999)
Michal "Kameň" Kaminský – drums (1999–2001)
Petr "Dino" Šarina – bass (2001)
Marek Marunič – guitar (2000)
Jelle Smit – bass (2001–2003)
Johan Smit – drums (2001–2003)
Martin "Marsel" Ondejka – drums (2003–2005)
David Ševčík – drums (2005–2013)

Timeline

Discography

Albums

Full 
 2003 Dawn of the New Age
 2005 Burninhell
 2008 In Full Swing
 2010 Earthshaker
 2013 Overdose & Overdrive
 2016 The Metallist

Split 
 1997 Eat the Flesh... and Vomica – split CD with Squash Bowels
 1998 Is This Earth's Last Century? – split CD with Alienation Mental
 1998 Four-way split CD with Agathocles/Abortion/Din-Addict
 2003 Grinding Party – split CD with Pulmonary Fibrosis
 2006 R'n'R Engine – split CD/LP with Gurkha

EPs

Full 
 1998 Equality!?
 2008 We Are the Metal – in limited edition with LP In Full Swing

Split 
 1995 Malignus Morbus – split with Decomposed
 1996 Forensic Clinicism – The Sanguine Article – split with Immured
 1996 Sick Sinus Syndrome – split with Mastic Scum
 1996 Swarming of Virulency – split with Ingrowing
 1997 Hungry Urinary URN – split with NCC/C.S.S.O./CUM
 1998 Rock Stars – Money Wars – split with Dead Infection
 2000 Murder for You to Eat – split with Vomito (1998)
 2000 ...And Man Made the End – split with Agathocles
 2000 Get to Attack – split with Unholy Grave
 2002 Oegstgeest Grindcore – split with Intumescence
 2003 In Oil We Trust – split with Critical Madnes/Szargyerek/Anubis
 2004 Hammer and Anvil – split with Lycanthrophy
 2014 Nación de Metaleros – split with Acidez

Demos 
 1993 Cadaveric Incubator of Endo-Parasites
 1994 Symphonies for Pathologist
 1995 Analyse of Pathological Conceptions
 1997 Killing for Profit

Videography

Video clips 
 2005 Clearance of Century
 2006 Saddam Hussein Is Rock 'n Roll
 2008 We Are the Metal
 2008 Dressed to Kill
 2010 Earthshaker
 2013 Overdose & Overdrive
 2014 At Full Throttle
 2016 Walk as We Talk

Live video clips 
 2008 Infernör – live from Obscene Extreme Fest
 2008 Bristroll – live as support Slayer
 2010 Satan Rise – live from Obscene Extreme Fest
 2012 Metal Artillery – live as support Slayer
 2013 Secret Source – live from Brutal Assault Fest

DVD 
 2005 Burning Sensation Tour Wildwest Tour
 2006 Satan Is Real Tour in limited edition with split LP R'n'R Engine
 2007 Europe Football Championship
 2016 The Way of Metallist

Others 
 2012 SmogOva Zona – documentary/music series

References

External links

1991 establishments in Czechoslovakia
Czech heavy metal musical groups
Musical groups established in 1991
Ostrava